Nora Fridrichová (née Nováková; born 13 September 1977) is a Czech television presenter, who works for Czech television channel Česká televize. She started presenting the programme 168 hodin (168 hours) in 2006. She was awarded the Novinářská křepelka prize in 2011, for journalists under 33 years of age.

Personal life
Fridrichová, married Milan Fridrich in 2004; they divorced in 2008. Fridrichová has two daughters, Diana and Mariana, with partner Robert Záruba, who is a sportscaster with the same channel.

References

1977 births
Living people
People from Pardubice
Charles University alumni
Czech television presenters
Czech women television presenters
Alumni of the University of London